Reijo Einar Ståhlberg (born 21 September 1952 in Ekenäs, Finland) is a 194 cm former Finnish shot putter whose competitive weight was 128 kg. He holds the Finnish shot put record of 21.69 meters and represented Finland in the 1976 and 1980 Olympics, placing 11th and 4th respectively. In the European Championships of 1974, he came in 11th, in 1978 4th, and in 1982 9th. He also won nine Finnish national championships and 3 European Indoor Championships in 1978, 1979 and 1981. The fourth Finn to put the shot 20 meters or more, Ståhlberg has been president of the Finnish 20 meter club since its inception in 1983.

References
sports-reference

1952 births
Living people
People from Raseborg
Finnish male shot putters
Athletes (track and field) at the 1976 Summer Olympics
Athletes (track and field) at the 1980 Summer Olympics
Olympic athletes of Finland
Universiade medalists in athletics (track and field)
Universiade silver medalists for Finland
Medalists at the 1979 Summer Universiade
Sportspeople from Uusimaa
20th-century Finnish people
21st-century Finnish people